Mahdi Olad (born 1 April 1986) is an Iranian Paralympic athlete specializing in shot put. He represented Iran at the 2020 Summer Paralympics.

Career
Olad represented Iran in the men's shot put F11 event at the 2020 Summer Paralympics and won a gold medal.
He also won a silver medal in men's discus throw F11 at the 2020 summer Paralympics.

References 

1986 births
Living people
Sportspeople from Tehran
Medalists at the World Para Athletics Championships
Iranian male discus throwers
Iranian male shot putters
Paralympic athletes of Iran
Medalists at the 2020 Summer Paralympics
Athletes (track and field) at the 2020 Summer Paralympics
Paralympic gold medalists for Iran
Paralympic medalists in athletics (track and field)
Paralympic silver medalists for Iran
21st-century Iranian people